Timber yard may refer to:

 Lumber yard in British English variants
 Timberyard Records